Kuhardt is a municipality in the district of Germersheim, in Rhineland-Palatinate, Germany.

See also
Kunhardt (disambiguation)

References

Germersheim (district)